Let's Go may refer to:

Film
 Let's Go (1918 film), a 1918 comedy short starring Harold Lloyd
 Let's Go (1923 film), a silent film written by Keene Thompson
 Let's Go! (film), a 2011 Hong Kong action film

Music

Albums
 Let's Go (David Campbell album), 2011
 Let's Go (Nitty Gritty Dirt Band album), 1983
 Let's Go (Rancid album), 1994
 Let's Go! (EP), an EP by The Apples in Stereo, 2001
 Let's Go, by Rocky Sharpe and the Replays, 1981
 Let's Go!, by The Ventures, 1963

Songs
 "Let's Go" (Calvin Harris song), 2012
 "Let's Go" (The Cars song), 1979
 "Let's Go" (Nocera song), 1987
 "Let's Go" (Pharoahe Monch song), 2007
 "Let's Go" (Shawn Desman song), 2005
 "Let's Go" (Trick Daddy song), 2004
 "Let's Go!" (Wang Chung song), 1987
 "Let's Go" (will.i.am song), 2013
 "Let's Go!", a Mickey's Fun Songs theme song from Disney's Sing Along Songs
 "F.N.F. (Let's Go)", 2022 song by Hitkidd and GloRilla
 "Let's Go", by Beenie Man
 "Let's Go", by Cartel
 "Let's Go", by Def Leppard from Def Leppard
 "Let's Go", by Group 1 Crew from Outta Space Love
 "Let's Go", by Kool Moe Dee from The Greatest Hits
 "Let's Go", by Korn from The Path of Totality
 "Let's Go", by LiveonRelease from Goes on a Field Trip
 "Let's Go", by Mark Schultz from Mark Schultz
 "Let's Go", by Ministry from The Last Sucker
 "Let's Go", by Namie Amuro from Uncontrolled
 "Let's Go", by Ramones from End of the Century
 "Let's Go", by Royce da 5'9" featuring Twista from Rock City
 "Let's Go", by Samy Deluxe
 "Let's Go", by Stuck in the Sound from Pursuit
 "Let's Go", by Travis Barker from Give the Drummer Some
 "Let's Go", by Zion I from Break a Dawn
 "Let's Go!", by Eurythmics from Revenge
 "Let's Go!", by Girl's Day
 "Let's Go (Nothing for Me)", by New Order from the soundtrack of the 1987 film Salvation!
 "Let's Go (Pony)", by The Routers, also covered by The Ventures
 "(Let's Go), Get Lost", by Patrick Wolf from The Magic Position
 "V Put" (English: "Let's Go"), popular Soviet marching song
 "Let's Go, Go-Go White Sox", the fight song of the Chicago White Sox professional baseball team
 "Let's Go, Let's Go, Let's Go", a 1960 song by Hank Ballard and the Midnighters

Publications
 Let's Go (book series), a series of travel guides
 Let's Go (textbooks), a series of children's textbooks by Oxford University Press
 Let's Go (So We Can Get Back), a 2018 memoir by Jeff Tweedy

Television
 Let's Go (1964 TV series), a Canadian entertainment series
 Let's Go (1976 TV series), a 1970s-1980s Canadian children's series
 Let's Go! (Philippine TV series), a teen sitcom
 Bakusō Kyōdai Let's & Go!!, a 1998 manga and anime series

Transportation
 Let's Go, a brand of Travel Express, a bus operator in the United Kingdom

See also
 
 
 Let Go (disambiguation)
 Pokémon: Let's Go, Pikachu! and Pokémon: Let's Go, Eevee!, two Pokémon role-playing video games
 "Let's Go", the motto of the U.S. 325th Airborne Infantry Regiment